Silvia Carolina Mazariegos (born 4 April 1961) is a Guatemalan Woman International Master (WIM) since 1987. Her higheat rating was 2135 (in April 2005) and she is ranked as Guatemala's 2nd best female player.

She is the champion of the Guatemalan women chess championship 22 times in the years: 1981 -1994, 2001, 2002, 2009, 2011, 2014, 2015, 2019.

She participated with the Guatemalan team in the Chess Olympiads in the years: 1984–1986, 2000, 2004–2012.

References

1961 births
Living people
21st-century Guatemalan women
Guatemalan chess players
Chess Woman International Masters
Chess Olympiad competitors